Lowville Presbyterian Church is a historic Presbyterian church located at Lowville in Lewis County, New York. It consists of restangular, stone, gable roofed main block erected in 1831 and an attached gable roofed wing added in 1906.  The front facade features a pavilion with triangular pediment surmounted by a staged wood bell tower that contains the "town clock."

It was listed on the National Register of Historic Places in 2007.

References

Churches on the National Register of Historic Places in New York (state)
Presbyterian churches in New York (state)
Federal architecture in New York (state)
Churches completed in 1831
Churches in Lewis County, New York
National Register of Historic Places in Lewis County, New York